Luiz Mattar was the defending champion, and retained his title defeating Andrew Sznajder 6–4, 6–4, in the final.

Seeds

  Luiz Mattar (champion)
  Andrew Sznajder (final)
  Cássio Motta (second round)
  Eduardo Bengoechea (first round)
  Martin Laurendeau (quarterfinals)
  Martin Wostenholme (semifinals)
  Brad Pearce (second round)
  Horacio de la Peña (first round)

Draw

Finals

Top half

Bottom half

References
General

Singles